Kuhitangiinae is a subfamily of darkling beetles in the family Tenebrionidae found in the Palearctic. There are two genera in Kuhitangiinae, each in its own tribe.

Genera
These tribes and genera belong to the subfamily Kuhitangiinae:
 Tribe Foranotini Nabozhenko & Sadeghi, 2017
 Genus Foranotum Nabozhenko & Sadeghi, 2017
 Tribe Kuhitangiini G.S. Medvedev, 1962
 Genus Kuhitangia G.S. Medvedev, 1962

References

Further reading

 
 

Tenebrionoidea